The National Motor Freight Traffic Association publishes the National Motor Freight Classification® (NMFC®), a standard that provides a comparison of commodities moving in commerce. The NMFC® is developed and maintained by the Freight Classification Development Council (FCDC).  

The NMFC® is a voluntary standard that provides a comparison of commodities moving in interstate, intrastate and foreign commerce. It is similar in concept to the groupings or grading systems that serve many other industries. Commodities are grouped into one of 18 classes—from a low of class 50 to a high of class 500—based on an evaluation of four transportation characteristics: density, stowability, handling and liability. Together, these characteristics establish a commodity's “transportability.”

The NMFC® also specifies minimum packaging requirements to ensure that goods are adequately protected in the motor carrier environment and can be handled and stowed in a manner that is reasonably safe and practicable. It contains various rules that govern and otherwise relate to the classification and/or packaging of commodities as well as procedures for the filing and disposition of claims, and procedures governing interline settlements. It also contains the Uniform Straight Bill of Lading, including its terms and conditions.

See also
Freight
Less than truckload shipping
Commodity Classification Standards Board
National Motor Freight Traffic Association

External links
Official Website
NMFTA Membership

References

Freight transport
Trade and industrial classification systems